Bishop of Smolensk is an ecclesiastical title that may refer to a bishopric (diocese or eparchy) in the following Christian churches:

 Roman Catholic Diocese of Smolensk
 Bishop of Smolensk (Roman Catholic)
 Ruthenian Catholic Archeparchy of Smolensk
 Russian Orthodox Diocese of Smolensk